Euxoa tristicula, the early cutworm, is a moth of the family Noctuidae. It was first described by Herbert Knowles Morrison in 1876 and is found in the United States and Canada, where it ranges from southern British Columbia, south through Oregon to central California along the coast. The habitat consists of coastal rainforests, mixed hardwood forests, and mixed hardwood-conifer forests at low to middle elevations west of the Cascades.

The wingspan is 38–42 mm. The forewings are whitish to greyish with large discal spots. The hindwings are dark brown to grey with a paler fringe. Adults are on wing from late spring to early September.

References

External links
"933342.00 – 10723 – Euxoa tristicula – (Morrison, 1876)". Moth Photographers Group. Mississippi State University. Retrieved January 8, 2018.

Euxoa
Moths of North America
Moths described in 1876